Upper Dunsforth is a village in located in the civil parish of Dunsforths, in the Borough of Harrogate of North Yorkshire, England. It was mentioned in the Domesday Book (1086) as Doneforde/Dunesford/Dunesforde.

References

Villages in North Yorkshire